I Apologize may refer to:

 I Apologize (album), an album by Ginuwine, or the title song
 "I Apologize" (1931 song), a 1931 song written by Al Hoffman, Al Goodhart and Ed Nelson
 "I Apologize" (Anita Baker song)
 "I Apologize", a song by Lionel Richie from Coming Home
 "I Apologize", a song by Hüsker Dü from New Day Rising
 "I Apologize", a song by Five Finger Death Punch from Got Your Six

See also
 "Apologize", a 2005 song by OneRepublic